Let Me Be There is the third studio album by British-Australian singer Olivia Newton-John. It was originally released in November 1973 as Music Makes My Day in the United Kingdom, by Pye International Records, and shortly after in Australia as Let Me Be There, which became its most recognisable name. In the United States and Canada, Let Me Be There was released with an alternative tracklist, combining songs from the original release with other tracks from Newton-John's previous albums If Not for You and Olivia.

Let Me Be There marked a shift in Newton-John's career. She achieved considerable success during her early years in the United Kingdom with some folk-inspired singles, but Let Me Be There would make the United States her largest market at the time, being considered her breakthrough album in this country and influencing an inclination to a more country pop sound that would define most of her next records in the 1970s. The songs "Take Me Home, Country Roads" and "Let Me Be There" were released as singles from the album.

Release
The American publication of the album by MCA Records used the cover art from Olivia's 1972 LP record Olivia, which was not released by MCA. Some of its songs were taken for the US publication, such as song titles from the British publications of the albums If Not for You and Olivia.

Though the title song was a commercial failure in England, it was Olivia Newton-John's first American top ten hit, successfully boosting her singing career in North America. She had previously charted in the Billboard Top 40 with the song "If Not for You". The LP sold 89,130 copies in Japan.

Critical reception

AllMusic editor Joe Viglione wrote in his retrospective review: "It's early Newton-John, a bit naïve and far from the sophistication of her Warm and Tender release on Geffen, but it works, especially because it contains her first two hit records."

Chart performance
The album was released to capitalise on the success of its title track that had earned Newton-John a Grammy for Best Country Female. The album was certified Gold by the RIAA in 1974, and it peaked at No. 54 on the US Pop chart and at No. 1 (for two weeks) on the Country chart.

Track listing
All songs produced by John Farrar and Bruce Welch.

Music Makes My Day

Let Me Be There 
In the United States, the album was released with artwork from her 1972 Olivia album and some different songs from this and some earlier Newton-John albums.

Personnel
Performers and musicians
Brian Bennett – drums
Terry Britten – guitar
Vicki Brown – background vocalist
Pat Carroll – background vocalist
John Farrar – arranger, background vocalist, instruments, producer
Mo Foster – bass
Cliff Hall – piano 
Jean Hawker – background vocalist
Alan Hawkshaw – arranger, piano
Dave Macrae – piano
Margo Newman – background vocalist
Olivia Newton-John – vocalist
Kevin Peek – guitar
Mike Sammes – background vocalist
Trevor Spencer – drums
Alan Tarney – background vocalist, bass
Bruce Welch – guitar, producer
Mark Warner – guitar

Charts

Weekly charts

Year-end charts

Certifications and sales

References

1973 albums
Olivia Newton-John albums
Albums produced by Bruce Welch
Albums produced by John Farrar

hu:Let Me Be There